The Finiș is a left tributary of the river Crișul Negru in Romania. It starts at the confluence of headwaters Bălăteasa and Izbucul. It discharges into the Crișul Negru in the village Finiș.

References

Rivers of Romania
Rivers of Bihor County